Arturo J. Kenny (born 12 December 1888, date of death unknown) was an Argentine polo player who competed in the 1924 Summer Olympics. He was born in Santa Fe. Kenny was part of the Argentine polo team, which won the gold medal.

References

External links
profile

1888 births
Argentine people of British descent
Argentine people of Irish descent
Year of death missing
Argentine polo players
Olympic gold medalists for Argentina
Olympic polo players of Argentina
Polo players at the 1924 Summer Olympics
Sportspeople from Buenos Aires
Sportspeople from Santa Fe, Argentina
Medalists at the 1924 Summer Olympics
Olympic medalists in polo